The Women's National Basketball Association's first overall pick is the player who is selected first among all eligible draftees by a team during the annual Women's National Basketball Association (WNBA) Draft. The first pick is awarded to the team that wins the WNBA draft lottery; in most cases, that team had a losing record in the previous season.

Eight first picks have won the WNBA Most Valuable Player Award: Lauren Jackson (three-time winner), Candace Parker (two-time winner), Diana Taurasi, Tina Charles, Maya Moore, Nneka Ogwumike, Breanna Stewart, and A'ja Wilson.  Candace Parker is the only player to win the WNBA Most Valuable Player Award during her rookie year.

Twelve first picks have won the WNBA Rookie of the Year Award: Chamique Holdsclaw, Diana Taurasi, Seimone Augustus, Candace Parker, Angel McCoughtry, Tina Charles, Maya Moore, Nneka Ogwumike, Chiney Ogwumike, Jewell Loyd, Breanna Stewart, and A'ja Wilson.

Four collegiate programs have multiple players that were selected first overall: UConn with five, Tennessee with three, and Notre Dame and Stanford with two each.

Key

List of first overall picks

See also
 List of first overall NBA draft picks
 List of first overall NBA G League draft picks

Notes

References